Operation Ostra Brama (lit. Operation Sharp Gate) was an attempt by the Polish Home Army to take over Vilnius from Nazi Germany's evacuating troops ahead of the approaching Soviet Vilnius Offensive. A part of a Polish national uprising, Operation Tempest, the action began on 7 July 1944 and lasted until 14 July 1944.

The main reason for the operation was for propaganda purposes – to claim full rights to Vilnius by retaking it before the Soviet Red Army arrived. The operation did not achieve its objectives.

Plans for uprising 
On 12 June 1944 General Tadeusz Bór-Komorowski, Commander-in-Chief of the Home Army, issued an order to prepare a plan of liberating Vilnius from German hands. The Home Army districts of Vilnius and Navahrudak planned to take control of the city before the Soviets could reach it. The Commander of the Home Army District in Vilnius, lieutenant colonel Aleksander Krzyżanowski, decided to regroup all the partisan units in the northeastern part of Poland for the assault, both from inside and outside of the city.

Operation Ostra Brama was meant to be carried out during an expected state of confusion among German units in Vilnius (Wilno), faced with the impending arrival of major Soviet forces. The Germans held strong positions in the fortified city.  On 26 June 1944 major  and lieutenant colonel  suggested a plan to Krzyżanowski. 'Ostra Brama order number 1' comprised an overall outline for an assault on Vilnius, where the Home Army forces of the combined districts Vilnius and Navahrudak would strike from the outside under the lead of lieutenant colonel Poleszczuk.

The Polish forces were organized into five groups:

 Combat Group 1 'East' – included the 3rd, 8th and 13th Brigade; the 3rd and 5th Battalion of the 3rd and 5th Infantry Regiment; ORKO "Groma" and OS "Wilczura" under major Antoni Olechnowicz
 Combat Group 2 'North' – Under the command of major "Węgielny"
 Combat Group 3 'Eastern South' – Under the command of "Jarema" contained the 9th Brigade, the 1st and 6th Battalions of the 77th Infantry Regiment, OD "Promienia" and OS "Gracza"
 Combat Group 4 'South' – Under the command of major Stanisław "Warta" Sędziak
 Combat Group 5 'West' – Under the command of cavalry master (rotmistrz) Zygmunt Szendzielarz.

Units inside the city were under the command of lieutenant colonel "Ludwik". According to the plan, the main attack was prepared from the east and southeast on 8 July. When the Red Army crossed the front, equivalent to where it was in 1916 (between Soly and Smarhon’), the uprising would begin.

Combat operations 
Because the Soviet Red Army was approaching the city faster than expected, Krzyżanowski made the decision to launch the operation one day sooner. On paper, he commanded between 10,000 and 15,000 partisan troops that were relatively well-armed; many had prior combat experience. The timely mobilisation for the battle for Vilnius proved a challenge, however. Some of Krzyżanowski's forces were diverted elsewhere or located tens of kilometers outside the city. Marching Polish columns encountered German forces evacuating Vilnius, leading to skirmishes along the way.  Altogether, only 4,000 to 5,000 tired soldiers were assembled outside the city by midnight on 7 July. Meanwhile, the German positions inside the city had been fortified and augmented by security and police troops as Vilnius, an important transportation hub, was designated a "fortress city". Most importantly, the Germans had been expecting the Polish attack for days, denying the Home Army an element of surprise.

The Polish attack on the morning of 7 July stalled almost immediately under heavy fire from German positions. At mid-day, the first armoured units of the Third Byelorussian Front appeared on the battlefield. From then on, until the conclusion of the battle on 13 July, Polish troops fought on the Soviet side. The first contacts with Soviet units took place when Combat Group 1 met with Soviet troops. The commander of the Soviet 35th Tank Brigade insisted on taking command of Combat Group 1. Pohorecki, without Polish Army approval, joined his forces under Soviet command; Wilk responded by immediately replacing Pohorecki with major Antoni Wasilewski "Olesiński", but it took the 8th Brigade several days to return to reconstitute.

The main Soviet forces arrived on 8 July, amounting to 100,000 soldiers in total with the aid of few hundred tanks and air support. The Wehrmacht forces under Generalleutnant Reiner Stahel attempted to break out, although only a small group reached the German lines. On 13 July, the remnants of the German garrison surrendered.

Aftermath 

When the battle was over, the Soviet Command demanded the immediate abandonment of Vilnius by Polish soldiers. Krzyżanowski was promised by the Soviets that the Polish would be supplied with equipment without any political conditions. On 16 July, Krzyżanowski was once again invited to the headquarters of Chernyakhovsky to sign an agreement. However, this time, the Soviets arrested Krzyżanowski and his chief of staff, Major Teodor Cetys, as well as other Polish representatives at the same time in Bogusze. The wave of arrests also included the delegates of Polish Government in London.

The replacement commander of the Vilnius district, Lieutenant Colonel Zygmunt Izydor Blumski, and commander of the Navahrudak district, Lieutenant Colonel Janusz Prawdzic Szlaski, moved their units into the Rūdninkai Forest under constant fire from Soviet aircraft. Those Polish Army that successfully reached the forests were commanded to make their way to Grodno, Białystok, or to disperse into the local terrain. The Soviets eagerly carried out the hunt for the soldiers of their still official ally, capturing over 5,700 Polish soldiers. Common soldiers were detained in Varniai, whereas officers were sent to Ryazan.

A few decided to join the 1st Polish Army under General Zygmunt Berling, while the majority were forcibly enlisted into the Soviet Red Army. However, those who refused to swear allegiance to the Soviet State were deported to Kaluga, in western Russia. There, they became part of the prisoner slave labor system, widespread in the Soviet Union at the end of the war, until their general release in 1947.

Stripped of their officers and confused, by 18 July, roughly 6,000 soldiers and over 5,000 volunteers had withdrawn to the forests around Vilnius. They were gradually encircled and captured by the Soviets.

None of what happened in Vilnius was disclosed to the general public in the West. Indeed, British media censored stories about these Soviet actions by decree of Minister of Information Brendan Bracken. The wartime allies of the Soviet Union, Great Britain and the United States, were not interested in revealing any news that would contradict with the general impression that the Soviet Union was a liberator of Europe from Nazi evil. Poland had already lost its eastern territories to Stalin at the Tehran Conference, but none of the Polish soldiers fighting in the Battle of Vilnius knew about it. This does not apply to the Polish government in exile, which was fully informed of the Western allies ' support for the Soviet position. For example, on April 25, 1944, during a meeting of British Prime Minister  Churchill with Z. Berezowski, a leading member of the National Democratic Party, and Gen S. Tatar ('Tabor'), the deputy chief of staff of the Home Army."He (Berezowski) said that the Poles trusted Great Britain and her Prime Minister and counted on his staunch and firm support in ensuring Poland's real independence and the integrity of her frontiers. Churchill said that while he was willing to assist Poland in regaining her independence he could not vouch for the integrity of her frontiers; he reaffirmed his support for the Curzon Line, surrendering Wilno and Lwow to Russia and compensating Poland in the West. Berezowski responded with an emphatic re-statement of Poland's determination to keep Wilno and Lwow, and if necessary to fight for them. Churchill answered 'in a grave,...even...gloomy, manner: "Obviously, a decision to resist, regardless of the consequences, is the privilege of every nation, and it cannot be denied even to the weakest.. ."".` Similar statements were received by the head of the Polish government in exile Mikolajczyk during his visit to the United States in June 1944 and meeting with President Roosevelt. "He (Roosevelt) assured Mikolajczyk that he could rely on 'the moral support' of Washington in his efforts to reach an understanding with Moscow.(6) He explained that he had, at Teheran, given Stalin the reasons why he could not join any 'detailed discussion' on Poland, and suggested to Mikolajczyk that 'he might be able to be of further assistance later on'. Moral support and no more, but Mikolajczyk from Roosevelt's words that the Curzon line as the basis of the Polish-Soviet territorial solution was proposed by Churchill, concluded that Roosevelt allegedly does not support it. It's easy to believe what you want to believe. "Regarding the territorial question, Roosevelt expressed the view that, if other matters could be settled, Stalin 'would be reasonable' about it. Mikolajczyk reported that, again referring to Teheran, the President said: 'Neither Stalin nor I proposed the Curzon Line as the frontier between Poland and the Soviet Union. It was Churchill who suggested it, and obviously Stalin immediately picked it up and accepted it.'5 From this Mikolajczyk deduced that Roosevelt was 'opposed to the Curzon Line' and he informed Jankowski accordingly". The Polish government in exile continued its political line that led to the Warsaw uprising on August 1, 1944.

References

Further reading 
 Roman Korab-Żebryk: Operacja wileńska AK. Państwowe Wydawnictwo Naukowe, 1985. 
 Home Army (pol. Armia Krajowa) suppression by NKVD/NKGB operations, in and around Wilno (Vilnius):
 July 6, 1944 Report
 July 17, 1944 Report
 July 18, 1944 Report
 July 20, 1944 Report

Ostra Brama
1944 in Lithuania
Ostra Brama
Ostra Brama
Military history of Vilnius
Jewish Lithuanian history
Ostra Brama
Political repression in the Soviet Union
Stalinism in Poland
Poland–Soviet Union relations
Uprisings during World War II
Generalbezirk Litauen
July 1944 events